Agrias narcissus is a butterfly of the family Nymphalidae. It is found in South America.

Subspecies

A. n. narcissus (Surinam, French Guiana, Brazil (Amazonas, Amapá, Pará))
A. n. tapajonus (Brazil (Pará, Amazonas))
A. n. stoffeli (Venezuela (Sierra de Lema))

References

Charaxinae
Nymphalidae of South America
Fauna of the Amazon
Environment of Pará
Environment of Amazonas (Brazilian state)
Taxa named by Otto Staudinger
Butterflies described in 1885